Annie Moriah Sage   (1895–1969) was an Australian nursing administrator and Matron-In-Chief in the Australian Armed Forces during World War II. She was a recipient of the Florence Nightingale Medal, honoured as a member of the Royal Red Cross and was a Commander of the British Empire.

Early life 
Sage was born in Somerville in 1895, and studied midwifery at the Women's Hospital in Carlton. She was registered as a midwife in 1924 and a nurse in 1926.

Military nursing career 
From December 1939 to January 1947, Sage served as a member of the Australian Army Nursing Service, Australian Imperial Force (AIF). In February 1940, she was posted as matron to the 2nd/2nd Australian General Hospital and in April sailed to the Middle East, serving in Gaza Ridge, Palestine and Kantara. In May 1941 Sage was promoted to matron-in-chief AIF (Middle East). The following year she was made a member of the Royal Red Cross, for her "gallant and distinguished service".

Later in 1942, she returned to Australia and was promoted to deputy matron-in-chief at Land Headquarters. In 1943 she was promoted again, this time to matron-in-chief, Australian Military Forces, and attained the rank of colonel. During this time she oversaw the development of Australian Army Medical Women's Service Training Scheme.

In 1945 she was amongst 100 recipients at an investiture at Government House Canberra, where she was presented with the Royal Red Cross by the Duke of Gloucester.

In 1947 she was awarded the Florence Nightingale Medal by the International Red Cross, for her military service.

Post-war career and retirement 
When Sage's military career ended in 1947, she became Lady Superintendent of the Women's Hospital, Carlton, and continued with her role as matron-in-chief, Citizen Military Forces part time. 

She was the founding president of the College of Nursing, Melbourne and in 1969 was made an Honorary Fellow.

In 1952 she retired from her role as matron-in-chief and later that year stood for pre-selection for the seat of Flinders in the 1952 by-election. While she was widely regarded for her role in World War II, it was reported at the time that members of the Liberal party felt that "Flinders cannot be won by a woman candidate". Sage was not selected, and Flinders went on to be contested by John Rossiter who lost to Keith Ewart (Labour).

Sage died in 1969 in Frankston, and was given military honours at her funeral in Springvale.

Awards and honours 
1942: Appointed Member of the Royal Red Cross

1947: Awarded the Florence Nightingale Medal for military service.

1951: Commander of the British Empire (Military Division)

Legacy 
In 1969 the College of Nursing, Melbourne, set up the Annie M. Sage Memorial Scholarship. This is now administered by Monash University, School of Nursing and Midwifery, and recipients receive $10,000.

References 

1895 births
1969 deaths
Australian military nurses
Australian women nurses
Australian Commanders of the Order of the British Empire
Florence Nightingale Medal recipients
Members of the Royal Red Cross